Curetis sperthis is a species of butterfly belonging to the lycaenid family. It is found in  Southeast Asia (Burma, Thailand, Peninsular Malaya, Langkawi, Singapore, Pulau Tioman, Sumatra, Java and Borneo).

Subspecies
Curetis sperthis sperthis (southern Burma, Thailand, Peninsular Malaysia, Langkawi, Singapore, Pulau Tioman, Sumatra, Java, Borneo)
Curetis sperthis kiritana Doherty, 1891 (Sumba, Sumbawa)
Curetis sperthis niasica Fruhstorfer, 1900 (Nias)
Curetis sperthis semilimbata Fruhstorfer, 1908 (Java)
Curetis sperthis baweana Fruhstorfer, 1908 (Bawean)
Curetis sperthis metayei Inoue & Kawazoe, 1965 (southern Vietnam)
Curetis sperthis kawazoei Okubo, 1983 (Tioman)

References

External links
"Curetis Hübner, [1819]" at Markku Savela's Lepidoptera and Some Other Life Forms. Retrieved June 6, 2017.

sperthis
Butterflies described in 1865
Butterflies of Asia
Taxa named by Baron Cajetan von Felder
Taxa named by Rudolf Felder